The sixth season of the American military drama television series SEAL Team started streaming on Paramount+ on September 18, 2022 until November 20. The season featured 10 episodes and the series 100th episode.

Cast and characters

Main 
 David Boreanaz as Master Chief Special Warfare Operator Jason Hayes a.k.a. Bravo 1/1B 
 Max Thieriot as Special Warfare Operator Second Class Clay Spenser a.k.a. Bravo 6/6B (episodes 1-8)
 Neil Brown Jr. as Chief Warrant Officer 2 Raymond "Ray" Perry, formerly Senior Chief Special Warfare Operator a.k.a. Bravo 2/2B
 A. J. Buckley as Special Warfare Operator First Class Percival "Sonny" Quinn a.k.a. Bravo 3/3B
 Toni Trucks as Lieutenant (junior grade) Lisa Davis
 Raffi Barsoumian as Senior Chief Special Warfare Operator Omar Hamza.

Recurring 
 Judd Lormand as Commander Eric Blackburn
 Jessica Paré as Amanda "Mandy" Ellis
 Note:

Episodes

Production 
On February 1, 2022, Paramount+ renewed the series for a sixth season which premiered on September 18, 2022.

On June 23, 2022, Raffi Barsoumian was cast as Omar Hamza.

References 

2022 American television seasons